Fino + Bleed is a studio album by the Canadian punk rock band Die Mannequin, released on September 8, 2009.  Fino + Bleed is Die Mannequin's first true studio album because their previously released studio album Unicorn Steak is a compilation of their first two EPs, How To Kill and Slaughter Daughter.  There is also a deluxe CD/DVD version of the album with the DVD containing the Bruce McDonald directed The Raw Side of…Die Mannequin.  The original release date was set for August 25, 2009 but was pushed back to September 8, 2009 in order to accommodate the addition of the documentary.

Track listing
""Intruder" Interlude" (Care Failure) - 1:34
"Miss Americvnt" (Care F./Harry Hess/Peter Lesperance) - 3:02
"Dead Honey" (Care F./Raine Maida/Chantal Kreviazuk) - 3:11
"Start It Up" (Care F./Jason "Space" Smith) - 3:06
"Suffer" (Care F.) - 2:42
"Bad Medicine" (Care F.) - 3:30
"Locking Elizabeth / "Fino + Bleed" Interlude" (Care F./Scott Cutler/Anne Preven) - 4:12
"Candide" (Care F./Anna Wayland) - 4:18
"Where Poppies Grow" (Care F.) - 3:09
"Caroline Mescaline / "Nobody's Graveyard, But Everyone's Skeleton" Interlude" (Care F./Hess) - 5:12
"Guns Not Bombs" (Care F./Space) - 3:37
"Open Season / "Whipper Snapper" Interlude" (Care F./Johnny Andrews) - 5:54

Personnel
Die Mannequin
Care Failure – guitar, lead vocals
Anthony "Useless" Bleed – bass, vocals
Jack Irons – drums

Technical staff and artwork
Produced by Matt Hyde
Recording engineer: Chris Rakestraw
Mixed by Mike Fraser (Except "Intruder", "Fino + Bleed", "Nobody's Graveyard, But Everyone's Skeleton" and "Whipper Snapper" Interludes mixed by Matt Hyde)
Assistant mix engineer: Eric Mosh
Mastered by Tom Baker
Art by Care Failure
Cover photography by Alishia Fox
Photography by David Waldman, Pete Nema, Willem Wernsen, Florian Kehbel and A.I.

See also
Die Mannequin

References

External links
Official website
Myspace

2009 albums
Die Mannequin albums